Ferrari is an upcoming American biographical film co-written and directed by Michael Mann about Enzo Ferrari, Italian founder of the car manufacturer Ferrari. The screenplay is adapted from the 1991 non-fiction book Enzo Ferrari — The Man, The Cars, The Races, The Machine by motorsport journalist Brock Yates.

Premise
Follows the life of Italian driver and entrepreneur Enzo Ferrari in 1957 as he deals with family problems while also preparing for the 1957 Mille Miglia.

Cast
 Adam Driver as Enzo Ferrari
 Penélope Cruz as Laura Ferrari
 Shailene Woodley as Lina Lardi
 Gabriel Leone as Alfonso de Portago
 Sarah Gadon as Linda Christian
 Jack O'Connell as Peter Collins
 Patrick Dempsey as Piero Taruffi
 Michele Savoia as Carlo Chiti
 Giuseppe Bonifati as Giacomo Cuoghi

Production
Michael Mann first began exploring making the film around 2000, having discussed the project with Sydney Pollack. In August 2015, Christian Bale entered negotiations to star as Ferrari. Filming was planned to begin in summer 2016 in Italy, In October of 2015, Paramount Pictures bought the worldwide distribution rights for the film. Bale exited the film in January 2016 over concerns of meeting the weight requirements for the role before the start of production. The project stalled until April 2017, when Hugh Jackman entered negotiations to portray Ferrari, and Noomi Rapace as his wife with Paramount no longer involved. The project would again go dormant until June 2020. Mann and Jackman were still attached, with Rapace no longer involved and with STX taking over international distribution. Filming was set to begin in April 2021.

In February 2022, Jackman had since left the film, with Adam Driver now starring as Ferrari. Penélope Cruz and Shailene Woodley also joined the cast. At the same time, STX also secured domestic distribution rights for the film with a theatrical release planned. In July, Gabriel Leone, Sarah Gadon, Jack O'Connell and Patrick Dempsey were added to the cast. Pre-production began in April 2022, with filming originally set to commence in July in Modena.

Principal photography began on August 17, 2022, in Italy. Filming occurred in Brescia in early October. Production of the film wrapped in late October 2022.

Release
A first-look was released in October 2022, with two pictures. Ferrari is currently being shopped around to other distributors and will release on Sky Cinema and Now in the United Kingdom in 2023.

References

External links

Upcoming films
2023 films
American auto racing films
American biographical films
Biographical films about businesspeople
Ferrari
Films based on biographies
Films directed by Michael Mann
Films produced by Michael Mann
Films set in 1957
Films set in Italy
Films shot in Italy
Films with screenplays by Troy Kennedy Martin
Films with screenplays by Michael Mann
STX Entertainment films